Teodor "Tore" Blom (April 23, 1880 in Lilla Edet – September 24, 1961 in Bromma, Stockholm) was a Swedish track and field athlete who competed at the 1900 Summer Olympics in Paris, France.

Blom competed in the long jump and the high jump. In the former he placed eleventh of twelve with a distance of 5.770 metres while in the latter he took last of eight jumpers clearing 1.50 metres.

References

External links

 De Wael, Herman. Herman's Full Olympians: "Athletics 1900". Accessed 18 March 2006.
 

Athletes (track and field) at the 1900 Summer Olympics
Olympic athletes of Sweden
Swedish male high jumpers
1880 births
1961 deaths
Swedish male long jumpers
Olympic male high jumpers
People from Lilla Edet Municipality
Sportspeople from Västra Götaland County